Jón Bjarnason (15 November 1845 – 3 June 1914) was born in Thvottá, Iceland and became a Lutheran minister. Later, he and his family came to North America and settled in Manitoba.

Bjarnason was a figure who is identified with the Icelandic immigration to North American areas and particularly to the province of Manitoba. He was associated with congregations in New Iceland and also in Winnipeg. He seems to have been a person who thrived on controversy which he also enjoyed. He was a charismatic individual and was supported by his wife who was also his partner.

References 

 

1845 births
1914 deaths
Canadian Lutheran clergy
Icelandic emigrants to Canada
Canadian people of Icelandic descent